University Admissions Finland (UAF) was a centralised application service for international Master's degree student applicants for eleven Finnish universities. After the application round for the autumn 2018 intake, University Admissions Finland closed down and the application processing was transferred over to each individual university for the future application rounds.

University Admissions Finland processed the applications, which included credential evaluation and verification of language skills. After UAF’s processing, the universities did the academic evaluation of the applications and carried out student selections. The admission requirements were set by the universities.

Universities using UAF application service:
Hanken School of Economics
Lappeenranta University of Technology
University of Eastern Finland
University of Helsinki
University of Jyväskylä
University of Lapland
University of Oulu
University of Tampere
University of Turku
University of Vaasa
Åbo Akademi University

See also
Education in Finland
List of universities in Finland

References

External links
www.universityadmissions.fi - official website
www.infopankki.fi
www.suomi.fi

Education in Finland
University and college admissions